.cn is the country code top-level domain (ccTLD) for the People's Republic of China introduced on 28 November 1990. Domain name administration in mainland China is managed through a branch of the Ministry of Industry and Information. The registry is maintained by China Internet Network Information Center (CNNIC). Entities connected to Hong Kong, Macau, and Taiwan often use .hk, .mo, .tw respectively, despite their corresponding second-level domains under .cn available for those regions. The Chinese script internationalized country codes are ".中国" (Simplified Chinese) and ".中國" (Traditional Chinese): both have been reserved but the former is more in line with present-day mainland Chinese orthography.

Second-level domains
Any individual may register for second-level domain names.  However, the registry has created a set of predefined second-level domains for certain types of organizations and geographic locations. Registrations for such third-level domains were available before second-level domains became available in 2003, and registrants of third-level domains were given priority for names at the second level.

Generic second-level domains
 ac.cn : Academic and research institutions
 com.cn : Industrial, commercial, financial enterprises and individuals
 edu.cn : Educational institutions (usually universities and colleges)
 gov.cn : Government departments (both central and local governments)
 mil.cn : Military organizations
 net.cn : Networks, NICs and NOCs
 org.cn : Non-profit organizations

Second-level domains of provinces
The two-letter abbreviations are the same as those found in the People's Republic of China National Standards "Codes for the administrative divisions of the People's Republic of China (GB/T 2260-2002)."

 ah.cn : Anhui Province
 bj.cn : Beijing Municipality
 cq.cn : Chongqing Municipality
 fj.cn : Fujian Province
 gd.cn : Guangdong Province
 gs.cn : Gansu Province
 gz.cn : Guizhou Province
 gx.cn : Guangxi Province
 ha.cn : Henan Province
 hb.cn : Hubei Province
 he.cn : Hebei Province
 hi.cn : Hainan Province
 hl.cn : Heilongjiang Province
 hn.cn : Hunan Province
 jl.cn : Jilin Province
 js.cn : Jiangsu Province
 jx.cn : Jiangxi Province
 ln.cn : Liaoning Province
 nm.cn : Nei Mongol Autonomous Region
 nx.cn : Ningxia Hui Autonomous Region
 qh.cn : Qinghai Province
 sc.cn : Sichuan Province
 sd.cn : Shandong Province
 sh.cn : Shanghai Municipality
 sn.cn : Shaanxi Province
 sx.cn : Shanxi Province
 tj.cn : Tianjin Municipality
 xj.cn : Xinjiang Uygur Autonomous Region
 xz.cn : Xizang Autonomous Region
 yn.cn : Yunnan Province
 zj.cn : Zhejiang Province

Internationalized domain names with Chinese characters
Internationalized domain names with Chinese characters may be registered at the second level under the .cn top-level domain.

On 25 June 2010, ICANN approved the use of the internationalized country code top-level domains ".中国" (China in simplified Chinese characters, DNS name xn--fiqs8s) and ".中國" (China in traditional Chinese characters, DNS name xn--fiqz9s) by CNNIC. These two TLDs were added to the DNS in July 2010.

CNNIC proposed around this time Chinese domain names in ".公司" (".com" in Chinese) and ".网络" (".net" in Chinese). However, these have not been recognized by ICANN yet and are only available via domestic domain name registrars.

Around 15 other generic domain names with Chinese characters have later been registered. See List of Internet top-level domains#Chinese characters.

See also
 .hk (Hong Kong)
 .mo (Macau)
 .tw (Republic of China (Taiwan))

References

 Provisional Administrative Rules for Registration of Domain Names in China

External links
 IANA WHOIS for .cn
 China Internet Network Information Center
 List of Neustar accredited registrars
 Ministry of Information Industry

Country code top-level domains
Internet in China
Computer-related introductions in 1990
1990 establishments in China
Internet properties established in 1990